Arena Riga is an indoor arena in Riga, Latvia. It is primarily used for ice hockey, basketball and concerts. Arena Riga holds a maximum of 14,500 and was opened on 15 February 2006.

It was built to be used as one of the venues for the 2006 IIHF World Championship, the other being Skonto Arena. The arena was designed by the Canadian company SCI Architects and Latvian firms SIA Merks and SIA Nams.

History

The 11,000-seat arena was constructed as a requirement for hosting the 2006 IIHF World Championship. Its construction overseen by Latvian Ice Hockey Federation president Kirovs Lipmans was delayed due to disagreements on the construction contract and finding an investor to fund the project. The Baltic Times reported that Lipmans was to blame for the delays, and that he was asked to resign for a conflict of interest in owning shares in the arena's management company.

It has been home to the Latvian national ice hockey team ever since and the Kontinental Hockey League club Dinamo Riga since 2008, as well as the Latvian men's and women's national basketball teams since 2006.

During the years the arena has also hosted many well-known artists from all over the world. A part of the events of the 2006 NATO Summit also took place in the venue.

The arena hosted the matches of EuroBasket Women 2009, EuroBasket Women 2019 and 'D' group of Eurobasket 2015.

The arena will host matches for the EuroBasket 2025 including the final phase.

Notable events
2006 IIHF World Championship
Sensation White 2007
IIHF Continental Cup 2008
2008 IIHF World Junior Ice Hockey Championships – Division I
EuroBasket Women 2009
Dinamo Riga vs. Phoenix Coyotes 2010
2011 FIBA Under-19 World Championship
2012 Kontinental Hockey League All-Star Game
2013 FIBA Europe Under-18 Championship
8th World Choir Games 2014 
EuroBasket 2015
2016 European Wrestling Championships
2016 Men's World Floorball Championships
Eurovision Choir of the Year 2017
World Boxing Super Series 2017–18, 2018–19
2018 IIHF World U18 Championships – Division I A
2018 FIBA Europe Under-18 Championship
2019 UEFA Under-19 Futsal Championship
EuroBasket Women 2019 (partially held in Serbia)
2019 Fed Cup ( vs )
2021 IIHF World Championship
2021 FIBA Under-19 Basketball World Cup
2022 UEFA Futsal Champions League Finals
2023 Davis Cup ( vs )
2023 IIHF World Championship

Concerts in Arena Riga

2Cellos
Thirty Seconds to Mars
A-ha
Adam Tensta
Al Bano
Alla Pugacheva
Apocalyptica
Avril Lavigne
Awakening Europe Baltija
Backstreet Boys
Bastille
Billy Idol
Björk
Bryan Adams
Bonnie Tyler
Chris Norman
Chris Rea
Combichrist
David Guetta
DDT
Deep Purple
Depeche Mode
Dmitri Hvorostovsky
Ed Sheeran
Elena Vaenga
Elton John
Enrique Iglesias
Eric Clapton
Eros Ramazzotti
Faithless
Glenn Miller Orchestra
Gojira
Golden Ring
Gotan Project
Gregorian
Grigory Leps
Gustavo
Hurts
Iggy and The Stooges
Imagine Dragons
Instrumenti
Iron Maiden
James Blunt
James Brown
Jean Michel Jarre
Katie Melua
Katy Perry
KISS
Korn
Kylie Minogue
Lana Del Rey
Lenny Kravitz
Limp Bizkit
Linkin Park
Lou Reed
Luis Fonsi
MakSim
Mariah Carey
Marilyn Manson
Mashina Vremeni
Metallica
Mika
Mireille Mathieu
Mumiy Troll
Muse
Nazareth
Nikolay Baskov
Nine Inch Nails
Ozzy Osbourne
Patricia Kaas
Paul Mauriat
Pet Shop Boys
Philipp Kirkorov
Pink
Placebo
Redfoo
Prāta Vētra
Queen + Paul Rodgers
R.E.M.
Rammstein
Rihanna
Ringo Starr & His All-Starr Band
Robbie Williams
Scorpions
Seal
Sex Pistols
Sigur Rós
Simply Red
Sofia Rotaru
Smokie
Suzi Quatro
Sting
Tiësto
Tokio Hotel
Toto Cutugno
Thriller – Live
The Orchestra
Valery Meladze
Vanessa-Mae
We Are Scientists
Verka Serduchka
Vitas
Zemfira
Zveri

See also 
 List of indoor arenas in Latvia
 List of European ice hockey arenas
 List of Kontinental Hockey League arenas

References

External links

Official website
Arena Riga at Hockeyarenas.net (archived copy)
Arena Riga at worldstadiums.com 

Sports venues completed in 2006
Buildings and structures in Riga
Indoor arenas in Latvia
Indoor ice hockey venues in Latvia
Basketball venues in Latvia
Sports venues in Latvia
Sport in Riga
Kontinental Hockey League venues
Snooker venues
2006 establishments in Latvia